Ragtime is a novel by E. L. Doctorow, published in 1975. It is a work of historical fiction mainly set in the New York City area from 1902 until 1912.

In 1998, the Modern Library ranked Ragtime number 86 on its list of the 100 best English-language novels of the 20th century. TIME included the novel in its TIME 100 Best English-Language Novels from 1923 to 2005.

Plot summary
The novel centers on a wealthy family living in New Rochelle, New York, referred to as Father, Mother, Mother's Younger Brother, Grandfather, and 'the little boy', Father and Mother's young son. The family business is the manufacture of flags and fireworks, an easy source of wealth due to the national enthusiasm for patriotic displays. Father joins Robert Peary's expedition to the North Pole, and his return sees a change in his relationship with his wife, who has experienced independence in his absence. Mother's Younger Brother is a genius at explosives and fireworks but is an insecure, unhappy character who chases after love and excitement. He becomes obsessed with the notorious socialite Evelyn Nesbit, stalking her and embarking on a brief, unsatisfactory affair with her.

Into this insecure setup comes an abandoned black child, then his severely depressed mother, Sarah. Coalhouse Walker, the child's father, visits regularly to win Sarah's affections. A professional musician, well-dressed and well-spoken, he gains the family's respect and overcomes their prejudice initially by playing ragtime music on their piano. Things go well until he is humiliated by a racist fire crew, led by Will Conklin, who vandalize his Model T Ford. He begins a pursuit of redress by legal action but discovers he cannot hope to win because of the inherent prejudice of the system. Sarah is killed in an attempt to aid him, and Coalhouse uses the money he was saving for their wedding to pay for an extravagant funeral. 

Having exhausted legal resources, Coalhouse begins killing firemen and bombing firehouses to force the city to meet his demands: that his Model T be restored to its original condition and Conklin be turned over to him for justice. Mother unofficially adopts Sarah and Coalhouse's neglected child over Father's objections, putting strain on their marriage. With a group of angry young men, all of whom refer to themselves as "Coalhouse Walker", Coalhouse continues his vigilante campaign and is joined by Younger Brother, who brings his knowledge of explosives. Coalhouse and his gang storm the Morgan Library, taking the priceless collection hostage and wiring the building with dynamite. Father is drawn into the  escalating conflict as a mediator, as is Booker T. Washington. Coalhouse agrees to exchange Conklin's life for safe passage for his men, who leave in his restored Model T. Coalhouse is then shot as he surrenders to the authorities.

Interwoven with this story is a depiction of life in the tenement slums of New York city, focused on an Eastern European immigrant referred to as Tateh, who struggles to support himself and his daughter after driving her mother off for accepting money for sex with her employer. The girl's beauty attracts the attention of Evelyn Nesbit, who provides financial support. When Tateh learns Nesbit's identity, however, he takes his daughter out of the city. 

Tateh is a talented artist and earns a living cutting out novelty paper silhouettes on the street. He tries working in a factory, where he experiences a successful workers' strike, but becomes disillusioned when he sees it change little about the workers' lives, although in the final chapter he still describes himself as a socialist. He starts making and selling moving picture books to a novelty toy company, becoming a pioneer of animation in the motion picture industry. Tateh becomes wealthy and styles himself "the Baron" in order to move more easily through high society. He meets and falls in love with Mother, who marries him after Father is killed in the sinking of the RMS Lusitania. They adopt each other's children, as well as Coalhouse's son, and move to California.

Mixed into the interwoven stories are subplots following prominent figures of the day, including those named above as well as in the Historical figures section below.

Historical figures 

The novel is unusual for the irreverent way that historical figures and fictional characters are woven into the narrative, making for surprising connections and linking different events and trains of thought about fame and success, on the one hand, and poverty and racism on the other. Harry Houdini plays a prominent yet incidental part, reflecting on success and mortality. As his success grows, he becomes increasingly depressed and believes his work is ultimately meaningless. After his mother's death, he becomes obsessed with exposing fraudulent occultism, while secretly longing to find a true mystic experience.
Arch-capitalist financier J. P. Morgan, pursuing his complex delusions of grandeur, becomes obsessed with reincarnation and Egyptian mysticism, and finds an unexpected kindred spirit in the down-to-earth Henry Ford. Traveling to Egypt hoping for a vision of his grand destiny, Morgan only dreams of a past life as an ordinary peddler. Socialite Evelyn Nesbit, desperate to escape the press, becomes involved with Tateh and takes it on herself to care for his daughter. On meeting the anarchist agitator Emma Goldman her identity is exposed and Tateh leaves her. Emma gives Evelyn comfort and guidance on how to free herself from the domination of men. Later, Younger Brother encounters Goldman, who advises him to move beyond his obsession with Evelyn. 
The black moderate politician Booker T. Washington tries to negotiate with Coalhouse Walker, without success.

Other historical characters mentioned include the polar explorer Robert Peary and his black assistant Matthew Henson, the architect Stanford White, Nesbit's mentally unbalanced husband Harry Kendall Thaw (who murdered White for allegedly sexually assaulting Nesbit when she was 15), Archduke Franz Ferdinand of Austria, Countess Sophie Chotek, Sigmund Freud, who rides the Tunnel of Love at Coney Island with Carl Jung, Theodore Dreiser, Jacob Riis, and the Mexican revolutionary Emiliano Zapata, whom Younger Brother eventually joins forces. Several real-life New York City officials also appear in the book: Manhattan District Attorney Charles S. Whitman and Police Commissioner Rhinelander Waldo.

Influences
The name Coalhouse Walker is a reference to Heinrich von Kleist's German novella Michael Kohlhaas (1811). The part of the story involving Coalhouse's humiliation and his increasingly desperate search for a dignified resolution closely follow the plot and details of the earlier work by Kleist. The connection was acknowledged by Doctorow, but it is a matter of opinion among critics whether this constitutes literary adaptation or plagiarism.

Literary significance
The novel was a nominee for the Nebula Award for Best Novel and won the National Book Critics Circle Award for fiction in 1975, and the American Academy and Institute of Arts and Letters Award in 1976.

Fredric Jameson's 1991 book Postmodernism, or The Cultural Logic of Late Capitalism devotes five pages to Doctorow's Ragtime, to illustrate the crisis of historiography and a resistance to interpretation.

Film and theatrical adaptations 
The novel was adapted for an eponymous 1981 movie and 1998 musical.

Further reading 
   See chapter 5, "Analysis of ambiguous narrative voice and issues of demystification".

References

1975 American novels
American historical novels
American novels adapted into films
Books with cover art by Paul Bacon
Cultural depictions of American people
Cultural depictions of Archduke Franz Ferdinand of Austria
Cultural depictions of Booker T. Washington
Cultural depictions of Emiliano Zapata
Cultural depictions of Harry Houdini
Cultural depictions of Henry Ford
Cultural depictions of Sigmund Freud
Culture of New Rochelle, New York
Novels about families
Novels by E. L. Doctorow
Novels set in New York City
Novels set in New York (state)
Novels set in the 1900s
Novels set in the 1910s
Random House books
National Book Critics Circle Award-winning works